The 1990–91 NBA season was the 45th season for the Boston Celtics in the National Basketball Association. During the off-season, the Celtics hired Chris Ford as their new head coach. After playing in Italy the previous season, former Celtics guard Brian Shaw would return to the team after a one-year absence. After failing to advance past the first round in the two previous seasons, it appeared going into the 1990–91 season that the Celtics were fading as NBA title contenders. However, the Celtics burst to a 29–5 start reminiscent of their title years of the 1980s, and once again established themselves as contenders, holding a 35–12 record at the All-Star break.

Beginning in January, Larry Bird began to miss significant playing time due to back injuries (Bird would miss 22 regular season games) and the team struggled in his absence. The team limped to the finish, losing 6 of their final 8 games to finish at 56–26 (still good for the Atlantic Division title and #2 seed in the East). The Celtics also qualified for the playoffs for the 12th consecutive season.

Bird averaged 19.4 points, 8.5 rebounds, 7.2 assists and 1.8 steals per game, while sixth man Kevin McHale averaged 18.4 points, 7.1 rebounds and 2.1 blocks per game, and Robert Parish provided the team with 14.9 points, 10.6 rebounds and 1.3 blocks per game. Bird, McHale and Parish were all selected for the 1991 NBA All-Star Game, with Ford coaching the Eastern Conference, but Bird did not participate due to injury. In addition, Reggie Lewis finished second on the team in scoring with 18.7 points per game, while Kevin Gamble contributed 15.6 points per game, Shaw provided with 13.8 points, 7.6 assists and 1.3 steals per game, and top draft pick Dee Brown averaged 8.7 points and 4.2 assists per game off the bench, was named to the NBA All-Rookie First Team, and also won the Slam Dunk Contest during the All-Star Weekend in Charlotte. Bird also finished tied in ninth place in Most Valuable Player voting, while McHale finished in third place in Sixth Man of the Year voting, Gamble finished in second place in Most Improved Player voting, and Ford finished in third place in Coach of the Year voting.

In the Eastern Conference First Round of the playoffs, the Celtics survived a scare from the 7th-seeded Indiana Pacers, going the full five games before winning a classic finale (in which Bird went to the locker room during the game with injury, only to return and finish with 32 points). In the Eastern Conference Semi-finals, the Celtics held home court advantage against the 2-time defending NBA Champion Detroit Pistons, but Bird missed Game 1 with injury and the Pistons took the game at Boston Garden, 86–75. Bird returned for the remainder of the series and the Celtics rallied to win Games 2 and 3 (Game 3 a blowout win in Detroit, 115–83), but Detroit won 3 in a row afterwards to take the series.

Draft picks

Roster

Regular season

Season standings

y – clinched division title
x – clinched playoff spot

z – clinched division title
y – clinched division title
x – clinched playoff spot

Record vs. opponents

Game log

|- align="center" bgcolor="#bbffbb"
| 1 || Fri. Nov. 2 || Cleveland Cavaliers  || 125-101 || Boston Garden ||1-0
|- align="center" bgcolor="#bbffbb"
| 2 || Sat. Nov. 3 || @ New York Knicks  || 106-103  || Madison Square Garden ||2-0
|- align="center" bgcolor="#bbffbb"
| 3 || Tue. Nov. 6  || @ Chicago Bulls || 110-108 || Chicago Stadium || 3-0
|- align="center" bgcolor="edbebf"
| 4 || Fri. Nov. 9  || Chicago Bulls || 100-120 || Boston Garden || 3-1
|- align="center" bgcolor="#bbffbb"
| 5 || Sat. Nov. 10 || @ New Jersey Nets || 105-91 || Brendan Byrne Arena || 4-1
|- align="center" bgcolor="edbebf" 
| 6 || Tue. Nov. 13 || @ Milwaukee Bucks || 91-119 || Bradley Center || 4-2
|- align="center" bgcolor="#bbffbb"
| 7 || Wed. Nov. 14  || Charlotte Hornets || 135-126 || Boston Garden ||5-2
|- align="center" bgcolor="#bbffbb"
| 8 || Fri. Nov. 16  || Utah Jazz || 114-89 || Boston Garden || 6-2
|- align="center" bgcolor="#bbffbb"
| 9 || Sat. Nov. 17  || @ Washington Bullets || 102-90 || Capital Centre || 7-2
|- align="center" bgcolor="#bbffbb"
| 10 || Wed. Nov. 21 ||  Houston Rockets || 108-95 || Boston Garden || 8-2
|- align="center" bgcolor="#bbffbb"
| 11 || Fri. Nov. 23  || Sacramento Kings || 115-105 || Boston Garden || 9-2
|- align="center" bgcolor="#bbffbb"
| 12 || Sat. Nov. 24 || @ Cleveland Cavaliers || 113-102 || Richfield Coliseum || 10-2
|- align="center" bgcolor="#bbffbb"
| 13 || Mon. Nov. 26  || Miami Heat || 118-101 || Hartford Civic Center || 11-2
|- align="center" bgcolor="#bbffbb"
| 14 || Fri. Nov. 30  || Washington Bullets  || 123-95 || Boston Garden || 12-2
|-

|- align="center" bgcolor="edbebf"
| 15 || Sat. Dec. 1  || @ Philadelphia 76ers  || 110-116 || The Spectrum || 12-3
|- align="center" bgcolor="#bbffbb"
| 16 || Mon. Dec. 3  || Seattle SuperSonics  || 135-102 || Boston Garden || 13-3
|- align="center" bgcolor="#bbffbb"
| 17 || Wed. Dec. 5  || Denver Nuggets  || 148-140 || Boston Garden || 14-3
|- align="center" bgcolor="#bbffbb"
| 18 || Fri. Dec. 7  || @ Dallas Mavericks  || 112-104 || Reunion Arena || 15-3
|- align="center" bgcolor="edbebf"
| 19 || Sat. Dec. 8  ||  @ San Antonio Spurs  || 96-102 || HemisFair Arena || 15-4
|- align="center" bgcolor="#bbffbb"
| 20 || Mon. Dec. 10  || @ Houston Rockets  || 107-95 || The Summit || 16-4
|- align="center" bgcolor="#bbffbb"
| 21 || Wed. Dec. 12  || Milwaukee Bucks || 129-111 || Boston Garden || 17-4
|- align="center" bgcolor="#bbffbb"
| 22 || Fri. Dec. 14  || Detroit Pistons || 108-100 || Boston Garden || 18-4
|- align="center" bgcolor="#bbffbb"
| 23 || Sat. Dec. 15 || @ Miami Heat || 114-100 || Miami Arena || 19-4
|- align="center" bgcolor="#bbffbb"
| 24 || Wed. Dec. 19  || Philadelphia 76ers || 115-105 || Boston Garden || 20-4
|- align="center" bgcolor="#bbffbb"
| 25 || Thu. Dec. 20 || @ Charlotte Hornets || 115-96 || Charlotte Coliseum || 21-4
|- align="center" bgcolor="#bbffbb"
| 26 || Sun. Dec. 23  || Atlanta Hawks || 132-104 || Boston Garden || 22-4
|- align="center" bgcolor="#bbffbb"
| 27 || Wed. Dec. 26  || Indiana Pacers || 152-132 || Boston Garden || 23-4
|- align="center" bgcolor="edbebf"
| 28 || Fri. Dec. 28  || @ Atlanta Hawks || 114-131 || The Omni || 23-5
|-

|- align="center" bgcolor="#bbffbb"
| 29 || Wed. Jan. 2  || New York Knicks || 113-86 || Boston Garden || 24-5
|- align="center" bgcolor="#bbffbb"
| 30 || Fri. Jan. 4  || Phoenix Suns || 132-103 || Boston Garden || 25-5
|- align="center" bgcolor="#bbffbb"
| 31 || Sun. Jan. 6  || Dallas Mavericks || 127-110 || Boston Garden || 26-5
|- align="center" bgcolor="#bbffbb"
| 32 || Tue. Jan. 8  || @ New York Knicks || 101-87 || Madison Square Garden || 27-5
|- align="center" bgcolor="#bbffbb"
| 33 || Wed. Jan. 9  || Milwaukee Bucks || 110-102 || Boston Garden || 28-5
|- align="center" bgcolor="#bbffbb"
| 34 || Fri. Jan. 11  || Los Angeles Clippers || 109-107 || Boston Garden || 29-5
|- align="center" bgcolor="edbebf"
| 35 || Sat. Jan. 12  || @ Washington Bullets || 99-116 || Capital Centre || 29-6
|- align="center" bgcolor="edbebf"
| 36 || Wed. Jan. 16  || Golden State Warriors || 105-110 || Boston Garden || 29-7
|- align="center" bgcolor="edbebf"
| 37 || Fri. Jan. 18  || New Jersey Nets || 106-111 || Boston Garden || 29-8
|- align="center" bgcolor="edbebf"
| 38 || Mon. Jan. 21  || @ Detroit Pistons || 90-101 || The Palace of Auburn Hills || 29-9
|- align="center" bgcolor="#bbffbb"
| 39 || Wed. Jan. 23  || Detroit Pistons || 111-94 || Boston Garden || 30-9
|- align="center" bgcolor="edbebf"
| 40 || Fri. Jan. 25 || @ Philadelphia 76ers || 94-116 || The Spectrum || 30-10
|- align="center" bgcolor="edbebf"
| 41 || Sun. Jan. 27  || Los Angeles Lakers || 87-104 || Boston Garden || 30-11
|- align="center" bgcolor="#bbffbb"
| 42 || Mon. Jan. 28  || @ Minnesota Timberwolves || 108-87 || Target Center || 31-11
|- align="center" bgcolor="#bbffbb"
| 43 || Wed. Jan. 30  || Orlando Magic || 144-102 || Boston Garden || 32-11
|-

|- align="center" bgcolor="edbebf"
| 44 || Fri. Feb. 1  || @ Charlotte Hornets || 91-92 || Charlotte Coliseum || 32-12
|- align="center" bgcolor="#bbffbb"
| 45 || Sun. Feb. 3  || Washington Bullets || 119-101 || Boston Garden || 33-12
|- align="center" bgcolor="#bbffbb"
| 46 || Wed. Feb. 6  || Charlotte Hornets|| 133-117 || Boston Garden || 34-12
|- align="center" bgcolor="#bbffbb"
| 47 || Thu. Feb. 7 || @ New York Knicks || 117-101 || Madison Square Garden || 35-12
|- align="center" bgcolor="#bbffbb"
| 48 || Tue. Feb. 12  || @ Seattle SuperSonics || 114-111 || Seattle Center Coliseum || 36-12
|- align="center" bgcolor="#bbffbb"
| 49 || Thu. Feb. 14  || @ Golden State Warriors || 128-112 || Oakland Coliseum || 37-12
|- align="center" bgcolor="#bbffbb" 
| 50 || Fri. Feb. 15  || @ Los Angeles Lakers || 98-85 || The Forum || 38-12
|- align="center" bgcolor="#bbffbb"
| 51 || Sun. Feb. 17  || @ Denver Nuggets || 126-108 || McNichols Sports Arena || 39-12
|- align="center" bgcolor="edbebf"
| 52 || Tue. Feb. 19  || @ Phoenix Suns || 105-109 || Arizona Veterans Memorial Coliseum || 39-13
|- align="center" bgcolor="#bbffbb"
| 53 || Fri. Feb. 22  || New Jersey Nets || 111-99 || Hartford Civic Center || 40-13
|- align="center" bgcolor="edbebf"
| 54 || Sun. Feb. 24  || @ Indiana Pacers || 109-115 || Market Square Arena || 40-14
|- align="center" bgcolor="edbebf"
| 55 || Tue. Feb. 26  || @ Chicago Bulls || 99-129 || Chicago Stadium || 40-15
|- align="center" bgcolor="#bbffbb"
| 56 || Wed. Feb. 27  || Minnesota Timberwolves || 116-111 || Boston Garden || 41-15
|-

|- align="center" bgcolor="#bbffbb"
| 57  || Fri. Mar. 1  || San Antonio Spurs || 108-98 || Boston Garden || 42-15
|- align="center" bgcolor="edbebf"
| 58  || Sun. Mar. 3  || Portland Trail Blazers || 107-116 || Boston Garden || 42-16
|- align="center" bgcolor="#bbffbb"
| 59  || Mon. Mar. 4  || Indiana Pacers || 126-101 || Hartford Civic Center || 43-16
|- align="center" bgcolor="#bbffbb"
| 60  || Wed. Mar. 6  || Miami Heat || 126-117 || Boston Garden || 44-16
|- align="center" bgcolor="#bbffbb"
| 61  || Fri. Mar. 8  || @ Los Angeles Clippers || 104-98 || L.A. Sports Arena || 45-16
|- align="center" bgcolor="#bbffbb"
| 62  || Sun. Mar. 10  || @ Portland Trail Blazers || 111-109 (OT) || Memorial Coliseum || 46-16
|- align="center" bgcolor="#bbffbb"
| 63  || Tue. Mar. 12  || @ Sacramento Kings || 110-95 || ARCO Arena || 47-16
|- align="center" bgcolor="edbebf"
| 64  || Wed. Mar. 13 || @ Utah Jazz || 109-112 || Salt Palace || 47-17
|- align="center" bgcolor="#bbffbb"
| 65  || Fri. Mar. 15  || @ Washington Bullets || 94-86 || Capital Centre || 48-17
|- align="center" bgcolor="#bbffbb"
| 66  || Sun. Mar. 17  || Philadelphia 76ers || 110-105 || Boston Garden || 49-17
|- align="center" bgcolor="edbebf"
| 67  || Tue. Mar. 19 || @ Atlanta Hawks || 92-104 || The Omni || 49-18
|- align="center" bgcolor="#bbffbb"
| 68  || Wed. Mar. 20 || Washington Bullets || 102-81 || Boston Garden || 50-18
|- align="center" bgcolor="edbebf"
| 69  || Fri. Mar. 22  || @ Indiana Pacers || 109-121 || Market Square Arena || 50-19
|- align="center" bgcolor="edbebf"
| 70  || Thu. Mar. 28  || @ Miami Heat || 88-90 || Miami Arena || 50-20
|- align="center" bgcolor="#bbffbb"
| 71  || Fri. Mar. 29  || Cleveland Cavaliers || 110-108 || Boston Garden || 51-20
|- align="center" bgcolor="#bbffbb"
| 72  || Sun. Mar. 31  || Chicago Bulls || 135-132 (2OT) || Boston Garden || 52-20
|-

|- align="center" bgcolor="#bbffbb"
| 73  || Tue. Apr. 2  || @ New Jersey Nets || 94-77 || Brendan Byrne Arena || 53-20
|- align="center" bgcolor="#bbffbb"
| 74  || Thu. Apr. 4  || New Jersey Nets || 123-104 || Boston Garden || 54-20
|- align="center" bgcolor="edbebf"
| 75  || Sat. Apr. 6 || @ Orlando Magic || 98-102 || Orlando Arena || 54-21
|- align="center" bgcolor="edbebf"
| 76  || Thu. Apr. 11  || @ Milwaukee Bucks || 92-111 || Bradley Center || 54-22
|- align="center" bgcolor="#bbffbb" 
| 77  || Fri. Apr. 12  || Miami Heat || 119-109 || Boston Garden || 55-22
|- align="center" bgcolor="#bbffbb"
| 78  || Sun. Apr. 14 || New York Knicks || 115-102 || Boston Garden || 56-22
|- align="center" bgcolor="edbebf"
| 79  || Tue. Apr. 16  || @ Detroit Pistons || 90-118 || The Palace of Auburn Hills || 56-23
|- align="center" bgcolor="edbebf"
| 80  || Thu. Apr. 18  || @ Philadelphia 76ers || 97-122 || The Spectrum || 56-24
|- align="center" bgcolor="edbebf"
| 81  || Fri. Apr. 19  || @ Cleveland Cavaliers || 117-124 (OT) || Richfield Coliseum ||56-25
|- align="center" bgcolor="edbebf"
| 82  ||Sun. Apr. 21  || Atlanta Hawks || 105-117 || Boston Garden || 56-26
|-

|-
| 1990-91 Schedule

Playoffs

|- align="center" bgcolor="#ccffcc"
| 1
| April 26
| Indiana
| W 127–120
| Reggie Lewis (28)
| Larry Bird (12)
| Larry Bird (12)
| Boston Garden14,890
| 1–0
|- align="center" bgcolor="#ffcccc"
| 2
| April 28
| Indiana
| L 118–130
| Lewis, Shaw (22)
| Robert Parish (12)
| Larry Bird (10)
| Boston Garden14,890
| 1–1
|- align="center" bgcolor="#ccffcc"
| 3
| May 1
| @ Indiana
| W 112–105
| Kevin McHale (22)
| Larry Bird (9)
| Brian Shaw (7)
| Market Square Arena16,530
| 2–1
|- align="center" bgcolor="#ffcccc"
| 4
| May 3
| @ Indiana
| L 113–116
| Kevin McHale (24)
| Robert Parish (12)
| Larry Bird (8)
| Market Square Arena16,530
| 2–2
|- align="center" bgcolor="#ccffcc"
| 5
| May 5
| Indiana
| W 124–121
| Larry Bird (32)
| Larry Bird (9)
| Brian Shaw (9)
| Boston Garden14,890
| 3–2

|- align="center" bgcolor="#ffcccc"
| 1
| May 7
| Detroit
| L 75–86
| Reggie Lewis (20)
| Kevin McHale (10)
| Brian Shaw (5)
| Boston Garden14,890
| 0–1
|- align="center" bgcolor="#ccffcc"
| 2
| May 9
| Detroit
| W 109–103
| Reggie Lewis (23)
| Robert Parish (13)
| Dee Brown (8)
| Boston Garden14,890
| 1–1
|- align="center" bgcolor="#ccffcc"
| 3
| May 11
| @ Detroit
| W 115–83
| Reggie Lewis (21)
| Robert Parish (11)
| Brown, McHale (6)
| The Palace of Auburn Hills21,454
| 2–1
|- align="center" bgcolor="#ffcccc"
| 4
| May 13
| @ Detroit
| L 97–104
| Kevin McHale (28)
| Robert Parish (10)
| Brian Shaw (6)
| The Palace of Auburn Hills21,454
| 2–2
|- align="center" bgcolor="#ffcccc"
| 5
| May 15
| Detroit
| L 111–116
| Reggie Lewis (30)
| Reggie Lewis (11)
| Dee Brown (10)
| Boston Garden14,890
| 2–3
|- align="center" bgcolor="#ffcccc"
| 6
| May 17
| @ Detroit
| L 113–117 (OT)
| Kevin McHale (34)
| Ed Pinckney (9)
| Reggie Lewis (5)
| The Palace of Auburn Hills21,454
| 2–4

Player statistics

Season

|-
| 
| 60 || 60 || 38.0 || .454 || .389 || .891 || 8.5 || 7.2 || 1.8 || 1.0 || 19.4
|-
| 
| 82 || 5 || 23.7 || .464 || .206 || .873 || 2.2 || 4.2 || 1.0 || 0.2 || 8.7
|-
| 
| 82 || 76 || 33.0 || .587 || .000 || .815 || 3.3 || 3.1 || 1.2 || 0.4 || 15.6
|-
| 
| 72 || 1 || 11.8 || .468 || .000 || .783 || 3.4 || 0.3 || 0.2 || 0.2 || 3.6
|-
| 
| 79 || 79 || 36.4 || .491 || .077 || .826 || 5.2 || 2.5 || 1.2 || 1.1 || 18.7
|-
| 
| 68 || 10 || 30.4 || .553 || .405 || .829 || 7.1 || 1.9 || 0.4 || 2.1 || 18.4
|-
| 
| 81 || 81 || 30.1 || .598 || .000 || .767 || 10.6 || 0.8 || 0.8 || 1.3 ||

14.9
|-
| 
| 70 || 16 || 16.6 || .539 || .000 || .897 || 4.9 || 0.6 || 0.9 || 0.6 || 5.2
|-
| 
| 19 || 0 || 3.4 || .406 || .000 || .900 || 0.7 || 0.1 || 0.1 || 0.1 || 1.8
|-
| 
| 79 || 79 || 35.1 || .469 || .111 || .819 || 4.7 || 7.6 || 1.3 || 0.4 || 13.8
|-
| 
| 5 || 0 || 6.0 || .429 || .000 || .600 || 0.4 || 1.2 || 0.2 || 0.0 || 1.8
|-
| 
| 2 || 0 || 8.0 || .250 || .000 || .750 || 0.0 || 2.5 || 0.5 || 0.5 || 2.5
|-
| 
| 47 || 3 || 8.3 || .475 || .250 || .815 || 1.2 || 0.9 || 0.1 || 0.0 || 4.6
|-
| 
| 31 || 0 || 5.4 || .462 || .000 || .556 || 1.6 || 0.1 || 0.0 || 0.9 || 1.9
|-
| 
| 6 || 0 || 6.5 || .250 || .000 || .750 || 0.5 || 1.3 || 0.2 || 0.0 || 2.0
|-
|}

Playoffs

|-
| 
| 10 || 10 || 39.6 || .408 || .143 || .863 || 7.2 || 6.5 || 1.3 || 0.3 || 17.1
|-
| 
| 11 || 0 || 25.8 || .491 || .000 || .824 || 4.1 || 3.7 || 1.0 || 0.5 || 12.2
|-
| 
| 11 || 11 || 21.6 || .483 || .000 || .667 || 1.2 || 1.7 || 0.4 || 0.2 || 6.0
|-
| 
| 5 || 1 || 6.2 || .444 || .000 || .000 || 2.2 || 0.2 || 0.0 || 0.0 || 1.6
|-
| 
| 11 || 11 || 42.0 || .487 || .000 || .824 || 6.2 || 2.9 || 1.1 || 0.5 || 22.4
|-
| 
| 11 || 1 || 34.2 || .527 || .545 || .825 || 6.5 || 1.8 || 0.5 || 1.3 || 20.7
|-
| 
| 10 || 10 || 29.6 || .598 || .000 || .689 || 9.2 || 0.6 || 0.8 || 0.7 || 15.8
|-
| 
| 11 || 0 || 15.5 || .762 || .000 || .810 || 3.6 || 0.2 || 0.5 || 0.2 || 4.5
|-
| 
| 11 || 11 || 28.7 || .470 || .333 || .867 || 3.5 || 4.6 || 0.9 || 0.1 || 11.0
|-
| 
| 10 || 0 || 8.6 || .429 || .000 || .786 || 0.9 || 0.5 || 0.3 || 0.1 || 2.9
|-
| 
| 2 || 0 || 3.0 || .500 || .000 || .000 || 0.0 || 0.5 || 0.0 || 0.0 || 1.0
|-
| 
| 1 || 0 || 4.0 || 1.000 || .000 || .000 || 2.0 || 0.0 || 0.0 || 0.0 || 2.0
|-
|}

Awards and records
 Dee Brown, NBA All-Rookie Team 1st Team

Transactions

Player Transactions Citation:

References

See also
 1990–91 NBA season

Boston Celtics seasons
Boston Celtics
Boston Celtics
Boston Celtics
Celtics
Celtics